Accountor Tower is a high-rise office building, designed by architects Castrén–Jauhiainen–Nuuttila, located in the Keilaniemi district of Espoo, just outside Helsinki, the capital of Finland. With a height of 84 metres (274 feet), it is currently the fifth tallest habitable building in Finland, and was the tallest building in Finland from its construction in 1976 until 2006. Formerly known as the Fortum Head Office and before that Neste Tower, as of May 2018 it is the headquarters of the Nordic financial software company Accountor.

The tower building was constructed between 1973 and 1978, while Uolevi Raade was the manager of Neste, which merged and later demerged with Imatran Voima, the predecessor of Fortum. As a result, the building is sometimes referred to as Raaden hammas (lit. "Raade's tooth"). When Imatran Voima merged with Neste, the merged company Fortum took the building as its headquarters. However, in the demerger six years later, the building was not returned to Neste Oil, but was retained by Fortum, the electricity producer. Consequently, Neste Oil had to construct a new office building nearby.

In 2017 the building was sold to Regenero Oy. Fortum's head office moved in the start of 2018 into a multi-space office located near the old office at Keilalahdentie 2-4. In addition to Fortum, the new head office building houses Tieto Oyj and Microsoft Oy. Regenero Oy leased the building to Accountor in early 2018.

See also
 List of tallest buildings in Finland

References

External links

Buildings and structures in Espoo
Headquarters in Finland
Office buildings in Finland
Skyscrapers in Finland
Skyscraper office buildings

Office buildings completed in 1978